The Microwave Humidity Sounder (MHS) is a five-channel passive microwave radiometer, with channels from 89 to 190 GHz.  It is very similar in design to the AMSU-B instrument, but some channel frequencies have been altered.  It is used to study profiles of atmospheric water vapor and provide improved input data to the cloud-clearing algorithms in the IR and MW sounder suites. Instruments were launched on NOAA's  POES satellite series starting with NOAA-18 launched in May 2005 and the European Space Agency's MetOp series starting with MetOp-A launched in October 2006 and continuing with MetOp-B launched in September 2012.

The Microwave Humidity Sounder was designed and developed by Astrium EU in Portsmouth, UK, under contract to EUMETSAT.

Instrument Characteristics 

Heritage: AMSU-B, HSB
Swath: 1650 km
Spatial resolution: 17 km horizontal at nadir
Mass: 63 kg
Duty cycle: 100%
Power: 74 W (BOL)
Data rate: 4.2 kbit/s
Field of View: ± 49.5 degrees cross-track
Instrument Instantaneous Field of View: 1.1 degrees circular

Table 1: Radiometric characteristics of the MHS

External links
NOAA KLM User's Guide

Spacecraft instruments
Satellite meteorology
Atmospheric sounding satellite sensors